Tagliapietra is a surname, and may refer to:
 Aldo Tagliapietra (born 1945), Italian pop musician
 Alvise Tagliapietra (1670–1747), Venetian baroque sculptor who worked on the Gesuati in Venice
 Gino Tagliapietra (1887-1954), Italian pianist and composer, editor of works by Ferruccio Busoni
 Giovanni Tagliapietra, Italian opera singer
 Guia Maria Tagliapietra (born 1998), Italian figure skater
 Lino Tagliapietra (born 1934), Venetian glass artist
 Lucas De Lima Tagliapietra (born 1990), Brazilian football player
 Robert Tagliapietra, designer, a founder of the New York fashion house Costello Tagliapietra
 Teresita Tagliapietra-Carreño, Italian pianist

Also
 Costello Tagliapietra, a New York fashion house